Carimbó is a Brazilian dance. The dance was common in the north part of Brazil, from the time that Brazil was still a Portuguese colony, originally from the Brazilian region of Pará, around Marajó island and the capital city of Belém.

Carimbó was a loose and very sensual dance which involved only side to side movements and many spins and hip movement by the female dancer, who typically wore a rounded skirt. The music was mainly to the beat of Carimbó drums. In this dance, a woman would throw her handkerchief on the floor and her male partner would attempt to retrieve it using solely his mouth.

Over time, the dance changed, as did the music itself. It was influenced by the Caribbean (for example, Zouk, and Merengue styles) and French/Spanish dance styles of the Caribbean, especially Cumbia from Colombia.

The style survives today, with Caribbean radio stations in the northern states of Brazil, such as Amapá, playing the music. The Carimbó style has formed the basis of some new rhythms like the Sirimbó, the Lari Lari and the Lambada.

Carimbó drum
The carimbó drum is approximately 1m tall and 30 cm wide and made of a hollow trunk of wood, thinned by fire, and covered with a deerskin.

References 

Brazilian dances